Protoschizomus is a genus of protoschizomid short-tailed whipscorpions, first described by Jon Mark Rowland in 1975.

Species 
, the World Schizomida Catalog accepts the following eight species:

 Protoschizomus franckei Monjaraz-Ruedas, 2013 – Mexico
 Protoschizomus gertschi Cokendolpher & Reddell, 1992 – Mexico
 Protoschizomus occidentalis Rowland, 1975 – Mexico
 Protoschizomus pachypalpus (Rowland, 1973) – Mexico
 Protoschizomus purificacion Cokendolpher & Reddell, 1992 – Mexico
 Protoschizomus rowlandi Cokendolpher & Reddell, 1992 – Mexico
 Protoschizomus sprousei Cokendolpher & Reddell, 1992 – Mexico
 Protoschizomus treacyae Cokendolpher & Reddell, 1992 – Mexico

References 

Schizomida genera